Frank Welker is an American actor who specializes in voice acting and has contributed character voices and other vocal effects to American television and motion pictures.

Voice-over filmography

Film

Television

Video games

Theme park voice roles
 The Funtastic World of Hanna-Barbera – Barney Rubble, Dinosaur
 Scooby-Doo! The Museum of Mysteries – Fred Jones, Scooby-Doo
 Jimmy Neutron's Nicktoon Blast – Goddard, Poultra
 Transformers: The Ride – Megatron, Devastator, Ravage
 Hong Kong Disneyland Mystic Manor – Albert
 Kitchen Kabaret – Mr. Eggz
 Country Bear Vacation Hoedown – Melvin the Moose, Randy the Skunk
 The American Adventure – Soldier

Commercial roles
 Honey Smacks – Dig'em Frog
 McDonald's – Grimace, CosMc
 Rice Krispies – Crackle
 State Farm – Fred Jones, Scooby-Doo
 Froot Loops - Toucan Sam's Nephews, Newton Mole

Live-action filmography

Film

Television

References

External links
 

American filmographies
Male actor filmographies